Avlonari is a village and a community (unit) of the Municipality
Kymi-Aliveri, in the eastern part of the Aegean island of Euboea, Greece. It was the seat of the municipality of Avlon, Ancient Aulon (hence the name; has homonyms), a former bishopric which remains a Latin Catholic titular see.
 
In 2011 its population was 637 for the village and 1,354 for the community, which includes the villages Chania, Dafni, Elaia and Lofiskos. Avlonari is situated on a hillside, 13 km northeast of Aliveri, 15 km south of Kymi, Greece and 47 km east of Chalcis.

Population

History 

Aulon, the ancient name of the town, appears in the Notitiae Episcopatuum, commencing with that of Byzantine Emperor Leo VI the Wise (886-912), as a Christian bishopric, a suffragan of the metropolitan see of Athens,  in the sway of the Patriarchate of Constantinople. No names of its first-millennium bishops are known.
 
After what is termed the Fourth Crusade (1202–04), Euboea was captured by Crusaders, establishing Italian baronies (initially Lombard, later on Venetian control) and Aulon became a diocese of the Latin Church. A Greek, Teodoros, was appointed, but destituted by the Metropolitan Latin Archdiocese of Athens, for refusing to receive his consecration according to the Latin rite; Pope Innocent III restored him after obtaining his liturgical submission (December 1208). yet a papal letter from July 1210 already mentions "bishop-elect", plausibly to replace the troublesome Greek Theodore, whom Innocent III addressed two more letters in 1211.
 
About 1234, the Latin Diocese of Negroponte obtained the union of al Latin sees on Euboea; this remained disputed between Aulon and Negroponte for several years.

During the Venetian rule of Euboea (15th century), twelve 50 m tall towers were built northeast and north of Avlonari to protect the village from raiders.

Titular see 
No longer a residential bishopric, this Aulon is today listed by the Catholic Church as a titular bishopric, being distinguished from an Adriatic diocese Aulon by using for the Euboean Aulon the Latin adjective Aulonensis, while the Latin adjective regarding the other Aulon in Epirus (modern Vlore, in Albania) is Aulonitanus.

The diocese was nominally restored in 1933 as Latin Catholic titular bishopric.

It is vacant, having had the following incumbents, so far of the fitting Episcopal (lowest) rank :
 Tomás Juan Carlos Solari (1943.08.23 – 1948.09.20) as Auxiliary Bishop of Buenos Aires (Argentina) (1943.08.23 – 1948.09.20); later Metropolitan Archbishop of La Plata (Argentina) (1948.09.20 – death 1954.05.13)
 Manuel Tato (1948.11.13 – 1961.07.11) as Auxiliary Bishop of Buenos Aires (Argentina) (1948.11.13 – 1961.07.11); later Bishop of Santiago del Estero (Argentina) (1961.07.11 – death 1980.08.12)
 Manuel Augusto Cárdenas (1962.04.07 – death 1998.07.28), first as Auxiliary Bishop of Buenos Aires (1962.04.07 – 1975.04.22), then as Auxiliary Bishop of Argentina of the Eastern Rite (1975.11.11 – 1992.02.11), finally on emeritate.

See also 
 List of Catholic dioceses in Greece
 Aulon for (ancient) namesakes
 List of settlements in the Euboea regional unit

References

Sources and external links 
 GCatholic
 Avlonari at the GTP Travel Pages
 Video on Avlonari from ERT's travelling program Traveling in Greece (Menoume Ellada) 
Populated places in Euboea
 Bibliography 
 Michel Lequien, Oriens christianus in quatuor Patriarchatus digestus, Paris 1740, Tomo II, coll. 226-227
 Raymond Janin, lemma 'Aulon', in Dictionnaire d'Histoire et de Géographie ecclésiastiques, vol. V, 1931, coll. 671-672